The William E. Harmon Foundation Award for Distinguished Achievement Among Negroes, commonly referred to as the Harmon Award or Harmon Foundation Award, was a philanthropic and cultural award created in 1926 by William E. Harmon and administered by the Harmon Foundation. It was offered for distinguished achievements in eight different fields: literature, music, fine arts, business and industry (such as banker Anthony Overton in 1927), science and innovation, education (for example, educator Janie Porter Barrett in 1929), religious service, and  race relations.

Although awards were created in eight categories, it is best known for its impact on African-American art of the Harlem Renaissance, and particularly on the visual arts. During its existence the Harmon award was largely considered synonymous with Negro visual art:
...the introduction of the Harmon foundation awards in 1926, which were always dispensed with a flurry of publicity, marked the beginning of a new era for Negro visual art. With its private endowment, popular social mission, and interracial alliances, [it] possessed a much  greater public relations capacity than any other prior initiatives....Due in large part to the activities of the Harmon Foundation, African Americans emerged as a distinct presence in the American art world.

Among the many recipients of the awards in literature and the fine arts were Claude McKay, Hale Woodruff, Palmer Hayden, Archibald Motley (his winning piece was The Octoroon Girl), Countee Cullen and Langston Hughes.

The awards were closely associated with an annual Exhibition of the Work of Negro Artists, conceived by Mary Brady. Exhibitions were held in 1927 through 1931, 1933, and 1935, and featured "substantial prizes" together with gold and bronze medals. According to Gates and Higginbotham, "...submissions in the fine arts category was the chief venue open to African American artists"

Awards were given solely on the basis of achievements in the previous year. The first year the awards were granted (1926) the judges of the awards proposed giving  Gold award for literature to Charles W. Chesnutt, "...to acknowledge his pioneering work and continuing example to other African American writers". Their intention was to waive the requirement that the award be granted solely for works completed during the previous year. However, the Harmon Foundation did not accept this proposal, and Chesnutt never learned of this "acknowledgment of high esteem from a distinguished panel of his literary peers both black and white."

Recipients of the award in every field except race relations were required to be African American – the latter could be awarded to "...any person of American residence, regardless of color, who has made an outstanding contribution toward improving relations between the white and Negro people in America." Thus Robert Russa Moton was the first African American to receive the race relations award (in 1930). He was preceded by Will W. Alexander in 1927, and a dual award to Julius Rosenwald and James Hardy Dillard in 1927, all of whom who were Caucasian.

Gold and Bronze medals were awarded in the various categories. The award for race relations had a much larger honorarium: it varied between $500 and $1,000.

A description of the Bronze medal won by A.M.E. Bishop John Hurst in 1926 appeared in the January 8, 1927, edition of the Baltimore, Maryland Afro-American:
The medal is of unusually beautiful design. On the obverse side is embossed a ship in full sail on the open sea with the inscription "Harmon Foundation" around the margin. On the reverse side are the words "Inspiration, Achievement Religious Service. Second award, 1926, John Hurst".

Administered during its first five years (1926–33) by Dr. George E. Haynes, the awards program was discontinued in 1933, which would have been the year of the 1932 awards. However, no awards had been granted in the previous year. A New York Times article in 1931 described the race relation category of the awards as "biennial".

A full list of the winners of each year was offered in contemporary New York Times articles.

Award Catalogues/Publications
Exhibition of Fine Art by American Negro Artists (1928)
Catalogue of an Exhibition of Paintings and Sculpture by American Negro Artists at the National Gallery of Art (1929)
Exhibition of Fine Art by American Negro Artists (1930)
Exhibition of Productions by Negro Artists (1933)

References

Further reading
 Armstrong, Samuel Chapman (1931). The Southern Workman, Volume 60.
 Barksdale, Richard Kenneth (1992). Praisesong of Survival: lectures and essays, 1957–89. University of Illinois Press. ; 
 Brawley, Benjamin Griffith (1966). The Negro Genius: a new appraisal of the achievement of the  American Negro in Literature and the Fine Arts. Biblo-Moser. ; 
 Calo, Mary Ann (2007). Distinction and Denial: Race, Nation, and the Critical Construction of the African American Artist, 1920–40. University of Michigan Press. ; 
 "Dr. Moton receives $1,000 Harmon Award" (January 6, 1930). The New York Times, p. 20.
 Dykeman, Wilma (1976). Seeds of Southern Change: The Life Of Will Alexander. W. W. Norton and Company, Inc. ; 
 Gates, Henry Louis, & Evelyn Brooks Higginbotham (eds) (2009). Harlem Renaissance Lives from the African American National Biography. Oxford University Press, USA. ; 
 Guzman, Jessie Parkhurst, & Lewis W. Jones (eds) (1952). Negro Year Book: A Review of Events Affecting Negro Life. WM. H. Wise & Co., Inc.
 "Harmon Award Presented" (February 19, 1930). The New York Times, p. 19.
 "Holsey shares Harmon Award with employees of New York office". Afro-American, Saturday, February 21, 1931, p. 1.
 Johnson, Charles Spurgeon, & Carter, Elmer Anderson (1969). Opportunity: Journal of Negro Life (1969), Vols 5–6, p. 20.
 Jones, Allen W. (1979). "Thomas M. Campbell: Black Agricultural Leader of the New South". Agricultural History, Vol. 53, No. 1, Southern Agriculture Since the Civil War: A Symposium, pp. 42–59.
 Leininger-Miller, Theresa (2001). New Negro Artists in Paris: African American Painters and Sculptors in the City of Light, 1922–1934, Rutgers University Press. ; .
 Wintz, Cary D., & Paul Finkelman (2004). Encyclopedia of the Harlem Renaissance. Volume 1. Routledge ; 
 Wintz, Cary D., & Paul Finkelman (2004). Encyclopedia of the Harlem Renaissance. Volume 2. Taylor & Francis Group. 
 Woodson, C. G. (1950). Harry Thacker Burleigh. The Journal of Negro History, Vol. 35, No. 1, pp. 104–05.
 Work, Monroe Nathan, & Jessie Parkhurst Guzman (1937). Negro Year Book: an annual encyclopedia of the Negro 1937–1938.'' Tuskegee Institute, Ala.: Negro Year Book Publishing Co.

Visual arts awards
Humanitarian and service awards
Awards honoring African Americans
Awards established in 1926